The 1942 Miami Redskins football team was an American football team that represented Miami University as an independent during the 1942 college football season. In its first season under head coach Stu Holcomb, Miami compiled a 3–6 record.

Schedule

References

Miami
Miami RedHawks football seasons
Miami Redskins football